Constance Laux (born January 21, 1952 in Cleveland, Ohio) is an American writer of romance novels as her real name and of mystery and young adult novels under her many pen names: Connie Deka, Connie Lane, Connie Laux, Casey Daniels, Zoe Daniels, Kylie Logan, Miranda Bliss, Mimi Granger, Lucy Ness, and Anastasia Hastings.

Biography
Constance Laux was born on January 21 in Cleveland, Ohio (U.S.). She studied English Literature at Queen's College in Oxford, England (UK).

She married her childhood sweetheart, and they live in Brecksville, a suburb of Cleveland, with their two children. 

Connie began writing during the summer of 1990 with her first book, The Fortune Teller. The book would go on to be nationally recognized.

Connie writes under many pseudonyms to differentiate the types and tones of books that she writes.

Bibliography

As Constance Laux
 Twilight Secrets 1992/Fev
 Moonlight Whispers 1993/Jan
 Earthly Delights 1995/Mar
 Touched By Magic 1996/Jul
 Devil's Diamond 1998/Apr
 Diamond Rain 1999/Apr
Lords of Desire multi-author series
 Diamonds and Desire 2000/Aug
Anthology contribution
 Angel Love 1996/Aug (with Janice Bennett, Mallory Burgess, Elizabeth Graham, Patricia McAllister, Doreen Owens Malek, Karen Ranney and John Scognamiglio)

As Connie Deka 
 Bright Promise 1993/Jun

As Zoe Daniels 
The Year of the Cat

 The Dream 1995
 The Hunt 1995
 The Amulet 1995

As Connie Laux 
Blood Moon

 The Curse 1995
 The Fortune Teller 1995
 The Reckoning 1996

Ghosts of Fear Street, with R. L. Stine

 Fright Night 1996

As Connie Lane 
 Reinventing Romeo 2000/Nov
 Romancing Riley 2002/Jan
 Guilty Little Secrets 2003/Mar
 The Viscounts Bawdy Bargain 2003/Jun
 Dirty Little Lies 2004/Mar
 The Duke's Scandalous Secret 2004/Aug
 Sarah's Guide To Life, Love & Gardening 2005/Jun
 Knit Two Together 2007/Mar
Burton at Cupid's Hideaway Series
 Stranded at Cupid's Hideaway 2002/Jul
 Christmas at Cupid's Hideaway 2003/Nov

As Miranda Bliss 
A Cooking Class Mystery

 Cooking Up Murder 2006
 Murder on the Menu 2007
 Dead Men Don't Get the Munchies 2007
 Dying for Dinner 2008
 Murder Has a Sweet Tooth 2009

As Casey Daniels
Pepper Martin Mystery Series
 Don of the Dead 2006
 The Chick and The Dead 2007
 Tombs of Endearment 2007
 Night of the Loving Dead 2009
 Dead Man Talking 2009
 Tomb with a View 2010
 A Hard Day's Fright 2011
 Wild Wild Death 2012
 Supernatural Born Killers 2012
 Graveyard Shift 2016
A Miss Barnum Mystery

 Smoke and Mirrors 2017

As Kylie Logan
Button Box Mystery Series
 Button Holed 2011
 Hot Button 2012
 Panic Button 2012
 Buttoned Up 2013
League of Literary Ladies Series
 Mayhem at the Orient Express 2013
 A Tale of Two Biddies 2014
 The Legend of Sleepy Harlow 2014
 And Then There Were Nuns 2016
 Gone with the Twins 2017
Chili Cook-Off Series
 Chili Con Carnage 2013
 Death by Devil's Breath 2014
 Revenge of the Chili Queens 2015
An Ethnic Eats Mystery
 Irish Stewed 2016
 French Fried 2017
 Italian Iced 2018
Jazz Ramsey Series

 The Scent of Murder 2019
 The Secrets of Bones 2020
 A Trail of Lies 2021

As Lucy Ness 
A Haunted Mansion Mystery

 Haunted Homicide 2020
 Phantoms and Felonies 2021

As Mimi Granger 
A Love is Murder Mystery

 Death of a Red-Hot Rancher 2021
 Murder of a Mail-Order Bride 2022

As Anastasia Hastings 
A Dear Miss Hermione Mystery

 Of Manners and Murder 2023

References and sources
 Constance Laux, Connie Lane, and Kylie Logan in Fantastic Fiction
 Author Website

References

External links 
 Official Site

Living people
Writers from Cleveland
American romantic fiction writers
Alumni of The Queen's College, Oxford
1952 births